The Encyclopedia of Language and Linguistics, first published in 1994 (edited by Ronald E. Asher), with a 2nd edition in 2006 (edited by Keith Brown), is an encyclopedia of all matters related to language and linguistics.

Reception
The Journal of Linguistics described it as "the definitive and indispensable scholarly reference publication, on all branches of linguistics for any library where linguistics is taken seriously." The second edition has 11,000 pages and 3,000 articles in 14 volumes.

References

External links
Encyclopedia of Language and Linguistics, 2nd edition (archived from the original on 2008-06-17)
Encyclopedia of Language and Linguistics (archived from the original on 2007-10-23)

Encyclopedias of linguistics
21st-century encyclopedias
Elsevier books